= Free Feminist Union =

Moroccan feminist organization

The Free Feminist Union - UFL -(Arabic: الإتحاد النسائي الحر) is a Moroccan organization that advocates for the rights of women and their protection against gender and sex based violence.

== Description ==
Created on March 21, 2016, the Free Feminist Union is an association that fights against violence based on gender and sexuality. This is the first structure that has obtained the authorization of the Moroccan government to fight against gender-based violence and to sexual orientation.

== Victims assistance ==
It provides legal, psychological and medical assistance for survivors of all forms of sexist or homophobic violations and discrimination. It also offers listening sessions with psychologists, and the provision if necessary of psychiatrists and lawyers.

== Advocacy and mobilization ==
The Free Feminist Union advocates for the rights of women and the LGBTQ + community.

It has participated with about forty associations in a mobilization of the women's movement in Morocco, for a deep reform of the Moroccan Family Code, accusing it of being discriminatory. This movement requires a thorough and comprehensive revision of all the books of the Family Code, including the one relating to inheritance, on the basis of the two principles of equality and non-discrimination based on sex, beliefs and family situation of children, in accordance with the provisions of the Constitution and the Convention on the Elimination of All Forms of Discrimination against Women

The Free Feminist Union has also taken a stand for the decriminalization of same-sex relationships in Morocco alongside other associations, following the arrest of two girls for homosexuality, due to a kiss.

== Manchoufouch mobile app ==
The Free Feminist Union launched, on March 21, 2018, in Rabat, the first application of documentation of the sexual harassment in Morocco, available in Moroccan dialect and in French on Google Play. Manchoufouch is a platform for denouncing all kinds of violence based on gender and / or sexuality. Deferred incidents are visible on an online map. The association orients witnesses or victims who shared their testimony to associative relays and informs about rights, including possible legal proceedings. A button asking for help makes it possible to systematically request the competent authorities.
